Ganthier is a commune in the Croix-des-Bouquets Arrondissement, in the Ouest department of Haiti. It has 71,261 inhabitants.

References

Populated places in Ouest (department)
Communes of Haiti